EU 27 may refer to:

 From 1 February 2020, the 27 European Union countries after the UK left the EU
 From 2016 until 31 January 2020, the 27 European Union countries involved in Brexit negotiations with the UK; in other words, the EU except for the United Kingdom
 the European Union in the period between 2007 and 2013, before Croatia joined, when it had 27 countries, or the countries that were members then
 the 2007 enlargement of the European Union